The Electric Sleep is the second studio album by Sheavy, released in 1998.

A demo of the album's title-track could be found on the web and was described as a lost Black Sabbath track.

Track listing
"Virtual Machine" - 5:51
"Velvet" - 4:05
"Destiny's Rainbow" - 3:23
"Electric Sleep" - 5:34
"Born in a Daze" - 4:08
"Automaton" - 4:10
"Savannah" - 6:37
"Saving Me" - 3:46
"Oracle" - 6:50
"Stardust" - 9:41
"Last Parade" - 5:15

1998 albums
Sheavy albums
Rise Above Records albums